Ilona Eduardovna Kremen (born 18 January 1994) is a Belarusian tennis player.

She has won four singles and 29 doubles titles on the ITF Circuit. On 24 June 2013, she reached her best singles ranking of world No. 201. On 21 July 2014, she peaked at No. 157 in the WTA doubles rankings.

Kremen won the Belarus National Open Championships in 2011.

On 6 February 2013, she made her debut for the Belarus Fed Cup team, winning her first international rubber after her Georgian opponent Sofia Shapatava retired in the third set of their tie.

ITF Circuit finals

Singles: 7 (4 titles, 3 runner-ups)

Doubles: 53 (29 titles, 24 runner-ups)

Fed Cup participation

Singles

Doubles

References

External links

 
 
 

1994 births
Living people
Belarusian female tennis players
Tennis players at the 2010 Summer Youth Olympics
Tennis players from Minsk
21st-century Belarusian women